Eugoa basipuncta is a moth of the family Erebidae first described by George Hampson in 1891. It is found in southern India and on Java and Borneo, as well as in Taiwan, Japan, Thailand and Australia (Queensland).

The wingspan is about 20 mm. Adults are pale brown, with one wide and one narrow dark brown band across the forewings and a number of brown spots.

References

basipuncta
Moths described in 1891